The 1999 PBA All-Star Weekend is the annual all-star weekend of the Philippine Basketball Association (PBA). The events were held from August 6–8, 1999.

Skills Challenge winners
Slam Dunk Competition: Robert Parker of Sta.Lucia   
Buzzerbeater event co-champions: Bal David of Brgy.Ginebra and Rodney Santos of Alaska
Three-Point Shootout: Jasper Ocampo of Pop Cola (defeated Roehl Gomez of Alaska, 17-8)
Two-Ball Competition: Johnny Abarrientos and Kenneth Duremdes of Alaska won over the San Miguel pair of Dwight Lago and Robert Duat, 38-30

All-Star Game

Rosters

Veterans
Benjie Paras
Kenneth Duremdes
Johnny Abarrientos
Alvin Patrimonio
Jerry Codiñera
Marlou Aquino
Bal David
Noli Locsin
Jun Limpot
Dennis Espino
Jeffrey Cariaso
Gerald Esplana
Coach: Tim Cone
Originally, Vergel Meneses and Victor Pablo were selected, but were replaced by Jerry Codiñera and Gerald Esplana because of injuries.

Rookies/Sophomores
Jason Webb
Eric Menk
Sonny Alvarado
Danny Ildefonso
Danny Seigle
Alvarado Segova
Andy Seigle
Ali Peek
Robert Parker
Noy Castillo
Patrick Fran
Asi Taulava
Coach: Alfrancis Chua

Game

Benjie Paras bag his second All-Star MVP honors, leading the Veterans to a 91-85 victory over the RSJ quintet. The 1999 Edition of the PBA All-Star game is said to be one of the best All-star game ever played, and it became more of a personal battle for the Veterans team of homegrown talents in proving to be better than the Fil-Americans, when the emergence of Fil-Ams dominating the league was a hot topic that year.

References

External links
Pilipinasbasketball.com

All-Star Weekend
Philippine Basketball Association All-Star Weekend